Stanmarkia is a genus of flowering plants belonging to the family Melastomataceae.

It is native to south-eastern Mexico and Guatemala.

The genus name of Stanmarkia is in honour of 2 American botanists; Paul Carpenter Standley (1884–1963) and Julian Alfred Steyermark (1909–1988). 
It was first described and published in Brittonia Vol.45 on page 198 in 1993.

Known species
According to Kew:
Stanmarkia medialis 
Stanmarkia spectabilis

References

Melastomataceae
Melastomataceae genera
Plants described in 1993
Flora of Guatemala
Flora of Southeastern Mexico